The Palazzo Mondragone, also known as Palazzo Mandragone, Ambron(n), Ricasoli di Meleto, or Peyron,  is a palace located on Via del Giglio #4r-8r in central Florence, region of Tuscany Italy.
 

The palace was designed by the architect Bartolomeo Ammanati.

Although not originally built by him, the current name stems from Fabio Arrazola de Mondragone, a Medici court intimate from Spanish descent who owned the Palace in the 15th century but ultimately fell in disgrace.

References

External links

Palaces in Florence